Market interventions are measures that modify or interfere with the market, usually done by governments but also by philanthropic and political-action groups.

Examples of market interventions

Market interventions include:
Bailouts pay (usually tax) money to people or organizations in financial difficulty; bail-ins transfer organizations from the ownership of their former shareholders to that of their creditors, cancelling the debt.
Competition laws aim to increase competition and prevent monopoly and oligopoly
Copyright is a legal monopoly granted on creative works
Minimum wages legislatively limit the lowest pay level
Monetary policy is manipulating the supply of money to attain economic goals; usually done by governments, as they are the ones that typically control currencies
Nationalization transfers a privately held thing into government ownership
Non-tariff barriers to trade restrict imports and exports by method other than direct taxes
Patents are legal monopolies granted on practical inventions
Privatization transfers a government-held thing into private ownership
Quantitative easing occurs when the government buys government bonds, raising their price and lowering the return per unit price to people and institutions buying government bonds.
Regulation bans, limits, or requires some market activities
Subsidies and market/government incentives pay money to produce some desired change in recipients
Cross subsidization and feebates are subsidies funded by a linked tax
Welfare is government support to individuals, in cash or in kind, often directed at basic needs

Levies
Bank levies are when banks are required to give one-off payments to governments
Capital levies require people or institutions to pay a one-time taxlike payment, to the government or some institution the government wishes to support; often paid only if above a certain level of wealth

Taxes

Taxes are also market interventions.

Market (economics)